"Wildwood Weed" is a 1964 country-western parody song written by Don Bowman.  It was the first track on Side 1 of Bowman's debut LP, Our Man in Trouble..."It Only Hurts When I Laugh" (RCA Victor catalog numbers LSP-2831 (stereo) and LPM-2831 (monaural)).  Its most famous version was recorded in 1974 by Jim Stafford and became the fourth of four U.S. Top 40 singles from his eponymous debut album. Musically, the song takes its inspiration from the Carter Family's instrumental recording "Wildwood Flower". In both versions, the lyrics in the verses are spoken rather than sung.

Background
The song is a story about farmers, two brothers, who take a sudden interest in a common wildflower on their farm and discover, after one of them begins chewing a piece, its enjoyable hallucinogenic and mind-altering properties. They begin to cultivate the plant in earnest; however, federal agents raid their farm and destroy their crop.  Nevertheless, the men are undeterred because they have saved a supply of seeds, overlooked by the agents. Despite the song's popularity, some AM radio stations banned it because of the references to marijuana.

Chart performance
"Wildwood Weed" reached number seven on the U.S. Billboard Hot 100, number five on Cash Box and number three on the Canadian pop singles chart. It was a crossover hit onto the Adult Contemporary charts of both nations (reaching number two in Canada), as well as the U.S. Country chart.

Weekly charts

Year-end charts

References

External links
  

1974 singles
1974 songs
MGM Records singles
Jim Stafford songs
Songs about cannabis
Songs written by Don Bowman (singer)